Shannon Smith (born September 28, 1961) is a former competition swimmer who represented Canada as a 14-year-old at the 1976 Summer Olympics in Montreal, Quebec.  She won a bronze medal for her third-place performance in the women's 400-metre freestyle with a time 4:14.60, coming behind East German Petra Thumer (4:09.89) and American Shirley Babashoff (4:10.46).  Smith also competed in the Women's 800-metre freestyle, finishing sixth in the event final and clocking a time of 8:48.15.

See also
 List of Olympic medalists in swimming (women)

References

External links
 
 

1961 births
Living people
Canadian female freestyle swimmers
Olympic bronze medalists in swimming
Olympic swimmers of Canada
Swimmers from Vancouver
Swimmers at the 1976 Summer Olympics
Medalists at the 1976 Summer Olympics
Olympic bronze medalists for Canada